Crestuma–Lever Dam is a concrete gravity dam on the Douro. It is located in the municipality Vila Nova de Gaia, in Porto District, Portugal.

Construction of the dam began in 1976. The dam was completed in 1985. It is owned by Companhia Portuguesa de Produção de Electricidade (CPPE).

Dam
Crestuma–Lever Dam is a 25.5 m tall (height above foundation) and 470 m long gravity dam with a crest altitude of 25.5 m. The volume of the dam is 205,000 m³. The spillway with 8 gates is part of the dam body (maximum discharge 26,000 m³/s).

Reservoir
At full reservoir level of 13 m (maximum flood level of 21.5 m) the reservoir of the dam has a surface area of 12.98 km² and a total capacity of 110 mio. m³. The active capacity is 22.5 (16 or 19) mio. m³.

Power plant 
The run-of-the-river hydroelectric power plant was commissioned in 1985 (1986). It is operated by EDP. The plant has a nameplate capacity of 117 (105 or 108) MW. Its average annual generation is 360 (311, 363, 366.9, or 399) GWh.

The power station contains 3 Kaplan turbine-generators (horizontal axis) with 39 (36) MW (36.1 MVA) each in a dam powerhouse located on the left side of the dam. The turbine rotation is 83.3 rpm. The minimum hydraulic head is 6.8 m, the maximum 12.6 m. Maximum flow per turbine is 450 m³/s.

The turbines and generators were provided by Sorefame.

Lock
On the left side of the dam is a lock, which can handle ships with the following maximum properties: 83 m in length, 11.40 m on the beam, 3.8 m load-draught and a cargo capacity of 2500 tons.

See also

 List of power stations in Portugal
 List of dams and reservoirs in Portugal

References

Dams in Portugal
Hydroelectric power stations in Portugal
Gravity dams
Dams completed in 1985
Energy infrastructure completed in 1985
1985 establishments in Portugal
Buildings and structures in Porto District
Dams on the Douro River
Locks of Portugal
Run-of-the-river power stations